James J. Flannery (October 31, 1938 – March 4, 2005) was a member of the Ohio House of Representatives.

References

Democratic Party members of the Ohio House of Representatives
1938 births
2005 deaths
20th-century American politicians
Place of birth missing